Mohamed Maghlaoui was the Algerian minister for housing in the 1995 government of Mokdad Sifi.

References

External links 

https://www.djazairess.com/fr/latribune/16454

Living people
Algerian politicians
1944 births
21st-century Algerian people